Afghan-Turk Maarif Schools are private chain of Turkish educational institutions currently working under Turkish Maarif Foundation, an educational institution connected to Turkish Republic with a special status. 20 branches of Afghan-Turk Schools are operating in Kabul, Herat, Mezar-ı Sherif,  Kandahar, Celalabad, Shibirgan, Akcha, with a total student population of more than 6000.

Program
Afghan Turk Maarif High Schools provide the  studies from pre-school to university level for the achievements in the Federal Board of Intermediate Education and other Provincial Boards of Intermediate and Secondary Education. Afghan Turk Maarif educational institutions prepare students for YOS (Foreign Student Education) which is essential to get admission to a higher education degree program in Turkey, thus facilitating them with the opportunity of further education in Afghanistan, Turkey and elsewhere in the world.

Schools
Kabul
 Afghan-Turk Maarif International School
 Afghan-Turk Maarif Schools - Ariana Boys High School
 Afghan-Turk Maarif Schools- Kabul Girls High School
 Afghan-Turk Maarif Schools- Kabul Primary School
 Afghan-Turk Maarif Training Centers - Kabul
 Afghan-Turk Maarif Darul-ulum
Mazar-e Sharif
 Afghan-Turk Maarif Schools - Mazar-e Sharif Boys High School
 Afghan-Turk Maarif Schools - Mazar-e Sharif Girls High School
 Afghan-Turk Maarif Training Centers - Mazar-e Sharif
Herat
 Afghan-Turk Maarif Schools - Herat Boys High School
 Afghan-Turk Maarif Schools - Herat Girls High School
 Afghan-Turk Maarif Schools - Herat Primary School
 Afghan-Turk Maarif Training Centers - Herat
Kandahar
 Afghan-Turk Maarif Schools - Kandahar Shah Hussain Hotak Boys High School
 Afghan-Turk Maarif Schools - Kandahar Girls High School
 Afghan-Turk Maarif Schools - Kandahar Primary School
Sheberghan
 Afghan-Turk Maarif Schools - Sheberghan Boys High School
 Afghan-Turk Maarif Schools - Sheberghan Fazilat Vahap Girls High School
Jalalabad
 Afghan-Turk Maarif Schools - Jalalabad Momin Boys High School
Aqcha
 Afghan-Turk Maarif Schools -Habiba Kadiri Girls High School

References

Private schools in Turkey
2018 establishments in Turkey
Educational institutions established in 2018